"" is the 3rd single by Zard and released 6 November 1991 under B-Gram Records label. The single debuted at #39 rank first week. It charted for 9 weeks and sold over 37,000 copies.

Track list
All songs are written by Izumi Sakai and arranged by Masao Akashi

composer: Tetsurō Oda

composer: Seiichiro Kuribayashi
 (original karaoke)
 (original karaoke)

References

1991 singles
Zard songs
Songs written by Izumi Sakai
Songs written by Tetsurō Oda
1991 songs
Song recordings produced by Daiko Nagato